IHBC may refer to:

 Institute of Historic Building Conservation, a professional body in the UK
 INHBC, a protein